Phosphorus trichloride is an inorganic compound with the chemical formula PCl3. A colorless liquid when pure, it is an important industrial chemical, being used for the manufacture of phosphites and other organophosphorus compounds. It is toxic and reacts readily with water to release hydrogen chloride.

History 
Phosphorus trichloride was first prepared in 1808 by the French chemists Joseph Louis Gay-Lussac and Louis Jacques Thénard by heating calomel (Hg2Cl2) with phosphorus.  Later during the same year, the English chemist Humphry Davy produced phosphorus trichloride by burning phosphorus in chlorine gas.

Preparation
World production exceeds one-third of a million tonnes. Phosphorus trichloride is prepared industrially by the reaction of chlorine with white phosphorus, using phosphorus trichloride as the solvent. In this continuous process PCl3 is removed as it is formed in order to avoid the formation of PCl5.

P4 + 6 Cl2 → 4 PCl3

Structure and spectroscopy
It has a trigonal pyramidal shape.  Its 31P NMR spectrum exhibits a singlet around +220 ppm with reference to a phosphoric acid standard.

Reactions
The phosphorus in PCl3 is often considered to have the +3 oxidation state and the chlorine atoms are considered to be in the −1 oxidation state.  Most of its reactivity is consistent with this description.

Oxidation
PCl3 is a precursor to other phosphorus compounds, undergoing oxidation to phosphorus pentachloride (PCl5), thiophosphoryl chloride (PSCl3), or phosphorus oxychloride (POCl3).

PCl3 as an electrophile
PCl3 reacts vigorously with water to form phosphorous acid (H3PO3) and hydrochloric acid:
PCl3 + 3 H2O → H3PO3 + 3 HCl

Phosphorus trichloride is the precursor to organophosphorus compounds. It reacts with phenol to give triphenyl phosphite:

Alcohols such as ethanol react similarly in the presence of a base such as a tertiary amine:

With one equivalent of alcohol and in the absence of base, the first product is alkoxyphosphorodichloridite:

In the absence of base, however, with excess alcohol, phosphorus trichloride converts to diethylphosphite: 
PCl3 + 3 EtOH → (EtO)2P(O)H + 2 HCl + EtCl

Secondary amines (R2NH) form aminophosphines.  For example, bis(diethylamino)chlorophosphine, (Et2N)2PCl, is obtained from diethylamine and PCl3.  Thiols (RSH) form P(SR)3.  An industrially relevant reaction of PCl3 with amines is phosphonomethylation, which employs formaldehyde:
 R2NH + PCl3  +  CH2O  → (HO)2P(O)CH2NR2  +  3 HCl
The herbicide glyphosate is also produced this way. 

The reaction of PCl3 with Grignard reagents and organolithium reagents is a useful method for the preparation of organic phosphines with the formula R3P (sometimes called phosphanes) such as triphenylphosphine, Ph3P.

Triphenylphosphine is produced industrially by the reaction between phosphorus trichlorid, chlorobenzene, and sodium:
,  where Ph = 

Under controlled conditions or especially with bulky R groups, similar reactions afford less substituted derivatives such as chlorodiisopropylphosphine.

Conversion of alcohols to alkyl chlorides
Phosphorus trichloride is commonly used to convert primary and secondary alcohols to the corresponding chlorides. As discussed above, the reaction of alcohols with phosphorus trichloride is sensitive to conditions.  The mechanism for the ROH →RCl conversion involves the reaction of HCl with phosphite esters:

.

The first step proceeds with nearly ideal stereochemistry but the final step far less so owing to an SN2 pathway.

Redox reactions
Phosphorus trichloride undergoes a variety of redox reactions:

PCl3 as a nucleophile
Phosphorus trichloride has a lone pair, and therefore can act as a Lewis base, e.g., forming a 1:1 adduct Br3B-PCl3.  Metal complexes such as Ni(PCl3)4 are known, again demonstrating the ligand properties of PCl3.

This Lewis basicity is exploited in the Kinnear–Perren reaction to prepare alkylphosphonyl dichlorides (RP(O)Cl2) and alkylphosphonate esters (RP(O)(OR')2).  Alkylation of phosphorus trichloride is effected in the presence of aluminium trichloride give the alkyltrichlorophosphonium salts, which are versatile intermediates:
PCl3 + RCl + AlCl3 → RPCl + AlCl
The RPCl product can then be decomposed with water to produce an alkylphosphonic dichloride RP(=O)Cl2.

PCl3 as a ligand
PCl3, like the more popular phosphorus trifluoride, is a ligand in coordination chemistry.  One example is Mo(CO)5PCl3.

Uses
PCl3 is important indirectly as a precursor to PCl5, POCl3 and PSCl3, which are used in many applications, including herbicides, insecticides, plasticisers, oil additives, and flame retardants.

For example, oxidation of PCl3 gives POCl3, which is used for the manufacture of triphenyl phosphate and tricresyl phosphate, which find application as flame retardants and plasticisers for PVC.  They are also used to make insecticides such as diazinon. Phosphonates include the herbicide glyphosate.

PCl3 is the precursor to triphenylphosphine for the Wittig reaction, and phosphite esters which may be used as industrial intermediates, or used in the Horner-Wadsworth-Emmons reaction, both important methods for making alkenes. It can be used to make trioctylphosphine oxide (TOPO), used as an extraction agent, although TOPO is usually made via the corresponding phosphine.

PCl3 is also used directly as a reagent in organic synthesis. It is used to convert primary and secondary alcohols into alkyl chlorides, or carboxylic acids into acyl chlorides, although thionyl chloride generally gives better yields than PCl3.

Safety
 600 ppm is lethal in just a few minutes.
 25 ppm is the US NIOSH "Immediately Dangerous to Life and Health" level
 0.5 ppm is the US OSHA "permissible exposure limit" over a time-weighted average of 8 hours.
 0.2 ppm is the US NIOSH "recommended exposure limit" over a time-weighted average of 8 hours.
 Under EU Directive 67/548/EEC, PCl3 is classified as very toxic and corrosive , and the risk phrases R14, R26/28, R35 and R48/20 are obligatory.

Industrial production of phosphorus trichloride is controlled under the Chemical Weapons Convention, where it is listed in schedule 3, as it can be used to produce mustard agents.

See also
Phosphorus pentachloride
Phosphoryl chloride
Phosphorus trifluorodichloride

References

Inorganic phosphorus compounds
Phosphorus chlorides
Phosphorus(III) compounds
Pulmonary agents